The Field Elm cultivar Ulmus minor 'Microphylla Rubra' was listed by C. de Vos in Handboek, 203,  1887, as Ulmus campestris microphylla rubra but did not include a description.

Description
Not available.

Cultivation
No specimens are known to survive.

References

Field elm cultivar
Ulmus articles missing images
Ulmus
Missing elm cultivars